San Antonio de los Baños Municipal Museum is a museum located in the 66th street in San Antonio de los Baños, Cuba. It was established on 28 December 1980.

The museum holds collections on history, weaponry, decorative arts, natural science and fine arts.

See also 
 List of museums in Cuba

References 

Museums in Cuba
Buildings and structures in Artemisa Province
Museums established in 1980
1980 establishments in Cuba
20th-century architecture in Cuba